Paulose I may refer  to:

Baselios Paulose I (1836–1913), the first Catholicos of the East after its reinstatement in India. The First Catholicos of the Malankara Orthodox Syrian Church
Cyril Baselios I (1935-2007), Maphrian and the first Major Archbishop of the Syro-Malankara Catholic Church

See also
Paulose II (disambiguation)